The African Youth Championship 1995 was a soccer tournament held in Nigeria. It also served as qualification for the 1995 FIFA World Youth Championship.

Qualification

Preliminary round
Benin, Botswana, Cape Verde, Congo, Liberia, Mauritania and Swaziland withdrew. As a result, Senegal, Lesotho, Guinea-Bissau, Togo, Burkina Faso, Sierra Leone and Madagascar advanced to the next round.

|}

First round
Kenya, Madagascar, Sierra Leone, Uganda, Zaire and Zimbabwe withdrew. As a result, Cameroon, Mauritius, Morocco, Burundi, Zambia and Ethiopia advanced to the next round.

|}

Second round

|}
Guinea also went through to the main tournament because Nigeria would qualify as host.

Teams
The following teams qualified for the tournament:

 
 
 
 
 
  (host)

Group stage

Group A

Group B

Semifinals

Third place match

Final

Qualification to World Youth Championship
The two best performing teams qualified for the 1995 FIFA World Youth Championship.

External links
Results by RSSSF

Africa U-20 Cup of Nations
Youth
1995
1995 in youth association football